Weimar. Lexikon zur Stadtgeschichte is the title of an encyclopedia on the history of the German city of Weimar. The non-fiction book was first published in 1993 and improved in 1997 by Böhlau Verlag in a second edition. It was edited by Gitta Günther, who worked as a Weimar city archivist from 1959 to 2001, together with the musicologist Wolfram Huschke and the geologist Walter Steiner.

Media 
 N.N.: Weimar-Lexicon / Stadt-Histörchen alphabetical, in Der Spiegel, edition 28/1993 of 12 July 1993; online

References 

Gazetteers
History of Weimar
German biographical dictionaries